Lee James Jude Capallero (born April 10, 1950), also known as Lee Ving, is an American guitarist, singer and actor.  

Ving is the frontman of the Los Angeles-based hardcore punk band Fear. As an actor, Ving played topless club owner Johnny C. in Flashdance (1983), motorcycle gang leader Greer in Streets of Fire (1984) and murder victim Mr. Boddy in the murder mystery film Clue (1985).

Early life
Ving was born Lee James Jude Capallero in Philadelphia, Pennsylvania, and grew up in the city's Kensington neighborhood. The Capallero family later moved to the suburbs and Ving attended St. Luke's Elementary School in Glenside as well as St. John of the Cross in Roslyn, before graduating from Abington Senior High School.

Ving's mother taught him to play the mandolin at four years of age. He began studying guitar at age eleven and later studied with musicians Jim Hall and John Abercrombie.  He also studied with Ted Greene after moving to Los Angeles. As a teen he listened to blues records and particularly enjoyed their striking guitar sounds.  He was also interested in Jimi Hendrix, the Rolling Stones, as well as the experimental New York rock group The Fugs. He joined his first band while still in high school. 

In 1966 Ving enlisted in the army and served stateside during the Vietnam War.

Music career

After leaving the army, Ving became involved in Philadelphia's folk, blues and R&B music scenes while studying Sociology at Villanova University. He joined the electric blues band Sweet Stavin Chain (SSC) as a vocalist and harmonica player. SSC frequently collaborated with jazz saxophonist Michael Brecker. The band also opened for The Who at the Electric Factory in 1968 and also opened for Cream at the Spectrum during Cream's farewell tour later that same year. After leaving SSC, Ving moved to New York and studied voice and guitar. In the mid-1970s he moved to Los Angeles, playing briefly with heavy metal bands before forming the hardcore punk band Fear. The band's first concert was in 1978. 

Ving is Fear's lead vocalist, rhythm guitarist and harmonica player and is the only member to have remained with the band since its inception. During Fear's performances at the L.A. punk scene, Ving was known for baiting his audience with insults, earning him the nickname "the Don Rickles of rock." Ving's vocals have been described as "bluesy", evoking Howlin' Wolf and Muddy Waters, while also having a "commanding, drill-sergeant vocal delivery and surly attitude helped to build a new breed of bad-tempered hardcore" and "a vein-busting rage that lends [Ving] the air of a loco Marine on a rampage."

1981 marked an important year for Ving and Fear. The band was featured in the documentary The Decline of Western Civilization about Los Angeles's punk scene. Ving was initially approached by the film's director, Penelope Spheeris, while he was posting concert promo flyers to telephone poles in Los Angeles. Spheeris also introduced Fear to her husband Bob Biggs, the founder and then president of Slash Records, who signed the group to his label; Fear released their debut album The Record with the label in 1982. 

Fear also appeared on the 1981 Halloween episode of Saturday Night Live (SNL) at the suggestion of SNL writer Michael O'Donoghue and then ex-SNL cast-member John Belushi. Belushi became a fan of Fear after seeing them perform in 1980 on the L.A.-based music television show New Wave Theatre; O'Donoghue had seen the band in The Decline of Western Civilization. Belushi had initially commissioned the band to record a song for his film Neighbors, but the movie studio rejected the recording and it never made the soundtrack. As a favor to Fear, Belushi and O'Donoghue made a deal with then producer Dick Ebersol whereby Belushi would make a cameo appearance on the show upon condition that Fear be allowed to perform as the episode's musical guests. A large portion of the crowd were punk music fans and included members of the bands Minor Threat, Cro-Mags, The Meatmen and Negative Approach who rushed the stage and were moshing. One of the slam dancers yelled "Fuck New York!" which was broadcast live. Dick Ebersol, who was stage manager at the time, decided to cut to tape once the obscenities could be heard.

Fear's performance was initially pulled from subsequent SNL reruns and recorded releases of the episode, but has subsequently been released in an edited form. The New York Post had initially reported that attendees of the performance caused $200,000 worth of damage, however both the Los Angeles Times and Billboard later reported that a program spokesperson confirmed the cost of damages was actually a $40 fine for "labor penalties." Both The Decline of Western Civilization and the Halloween SNL performance were an integral part of the history of hardcore punk, having exposed the music genre to a much wider audience. 

Ving's vocals and harmonica playing were featured on the track "Got to Get Out of New York" from saxophonist Tom Scott's 1983 album Target. Fear found it difficult to find clubs willing to let them perform after their SNL performance and the band stopped playing in 1987. That same year Ving formed a country band called Range War that toured California and Texas. Two years later Ving moved with his wife and son to Austin.

Fear re-formed briefly under the band's original lineup in 1993.  A couple of years later, Ving fronted an Austin-based band called Lee Ving's Army that later toured under the name Fear and included former Frank Zappa bassist Scott Thunes, drummer Andrew Jaimez and guitarist Sean Cruse.

Ving was also the vocalist for the band MD.45, which also featured Dave Mustaine of Megadeth. The band released their only album The Craving in 1996, however in 2004 the album was remastered and re-released with Mustaine's vocals replacing those of Ving.

Ving appeared in Dave Grohl's 2013 documentary Sound City and is a member of the supergroup Teenage Time Killers that came about due to the film. In 2015 Fear's recordings from the Belushi film Neighbors were recovered by Belushi's widow and Fear's music was re-mastered and re-mixed by Ving at Grohl's 606 studios in Los Angeles. Ving released the music digitally that same year. In an interview with Rolling Stone about Sound City, Grohl stated that Fear's performance in The Decline of Western Civilization inspired him to become a musician and that performing with Ving 30 years later was a "profound, life-altering moment."

Acting career
Ving (credited as Lee James Jude) and the other members of Fear appeared in the 1981 rotoscope animated film American Pop, directed by Ralph Bakshi.

In 1983, Ving appeared in several film roles.  He played a murderer in the horror anthology film Nightmares starring Emilio Estevez.  He appeared in Flashdance as the owner of a topless club who tries to convince Jennifer Beals' character to work for him. He played the over-the-top punk singer named 'Piggy' in the rock-and-roll comedy Get Crazy. 

A year later, Ving played Greer, the henchman of Willem Dafoe's character in the neo-noir rock musical film  Streets of Fire and also appeared as a criminal in a police lineup in an episode of the short-lived Three's Company spin-off Three's a Crowd.

In 1985, he played Mr. Boddy in the film Clue, based on the board game of the same name. While the film was unsuccessful in theaters on its first run, it later became a cult classic and it is often the role for which Ving is now most recognized.

In 1987 Ving appeared in the Who's the Boss episode titled "Walk on the Mild Side". Ving played Jake McGuire, a motorcyclist bad boy who Angela dates while fulfilling a list of wild things she wanted to do while in high school.  Ving's country band Range War also performed two songs during the episode.   Also in 1987, Ving reunited with director Penelope Spheeris for her film Dudes. Ving was cast as the main antagonist, a gang leader who murders one of the protagonists. The plot revolves around the murder victim's friends looking to bring the Ving's character to justice.  

Ving appeared in a cameo role in the 2009 National Lampoon comedy Endless Bummer. He was also cast in Death Rider in the House of Vampires, a Spaghetti Western horror film directed by Glenn Danzig that is set for release in 2020.

Discography

Fear
Guitar and vocals on all.
 The Record (1982)
 More Beer (1985)
 Live...For the Record (1991)
 Have Another Beer with Fear (1995)
 American Beer (2000)

Range War
 Home on the Range (recorded 1985, released 2017) - vocals, guitar

MD.45
 The Craving (1995) - vocals, harmonica

With Sound City Players
 Sound City: Real to Reel (2013) - vocals on "Your Wife Is Calling"

Filmography

Television appearances

Documentaries

References

External links

1950 births
American male film actors
American male singers
American punk rock singers
Fear (band) members
Living people
Musicians from Philadelphia
American people of Italian descent
Singers from Pennsylvania
MD.45 members